Wolodarsky Володарский (masculine) or Wolodarskaya Володарская (feminine) is a Russian and Ashkenazi Jewish surname. Notable people with the surname include:

 Imogene Wolodarsky, American actress and daughter of Wallace Wolodarsky
Manuel Wolodarsky, Ukrainian-Russian soldier and revolutionist
 Wallace Wolodarsky (born 1963), American actor and screenwriter

See also

 Peter Wolodarski
Vold (surname)
Volders (surname)
Volodarsky (disambiguation)
Volodymyr (name list)

References